Thomas Learmonth may refer to:

 Thomas the Rhymer (c.1220–c. 1298), 13th-century Scottish laird
 Thomas Livingstone Learmonth (1818–1903), Victorian colonist and namesake of the town of Learmonth